The Stork Exchange is a 1927 silent short film starring Krazy Kat. This film was thought to be lost but has been found. It is also one of the earliest in the cartoon series to feature Manny Gould and Ben Harrison's version of Krazy, the first of few incarnations derived from George Herriman's famous character.

Rediscovery
In 1948, cartoon producer Margaret J. Winkler had all the 1925–1929 Krazy Kat films kept in a storage facility. Because the films were made of a dangerous material called nitrocellulose, Winkler figured she had to get rid of them. Although a neighbor of hers showed interest in buying the films, she was still reluctant, and therefore gave the reels their final fate.

Nevertheless, a copy of The Stork Exchange and three other Krazy shorts were rediscovered in 2004 at an archive of the British Film Institute.

Plot
Krazy is driving his car on an urban road. As he goes on his journey, he spots a bird above, suspending something under its beak. The curious Krazy turns his vehicle into an aircraft, and takes off to investigate. Coming close in his flying car, he is amazed that the bird he spotted is a stork carrying an infant. He then sees the stork handing the child to a person on a rooftop before leaving. Although the bird leaves with an empty beak, Krazy continues to follow it.

The feline follows the stork into an adoption center up on the clouds. Inside, he is intrigued to see orphaned infants groomed and taken out of the place by other storks for delivery. Lunch time comes just then and one of the birds calls Krazy to watch over the infants. The infants are loud and bothersome but Krazy is able to keep them company. Suddenly, he receives a customer's order by phone. The cat then selects the suitable child for the delivery and takes off.

Up in mid-air for a few moments, Krazy is carrying the infant smoothly. But things become quite difficult for him as the tyke starts playing mischievously. Nevertheless, they reach the customer's house on time. When the infant's diaper comes off, the feline tries to put it back. The infant, however, refuses to wear it, and Krazy tries to do things in a scuffle, only to put the diaper on himself. The child then disappears mysteriously, and Krazy looks into the chimney. While he does, the infant shows up from the edge of the roof, and pushes him into the flue.

Krazy falls through the chimney and into the house with a waiting couple inside. Because of the diaper he's wearing, the couple mistakes him as the infant they ordered. The overjoyed wife then picks up, hugs, and smooches Krazy, much to the feline's dismay. After getting too much of the unwanted affection, Krazy removes his diaper and convinces the couple that there's a misunderstanding. Immediately, the infant he tried to deliver finally comes down the chimney and has been diapered somehow. The couple is finally pleased, knowing they got the correct order.

Remake
Years after the Krazy Kat staff had the cartoons distributed by Columbia, a remake of The Stork Exchange was released in 1931 under the title The Stork Market. The storyline of this later film is very similar to its earlier counterpart except that Krazy's spaniel girlfriend makes an appearance there.

See also
 Krazy Kat filmography

References

External links
 
 The Stork Exchange at the Big Cartoon Database
 An interview with... Nelson Hughes!

1927 short films
American silent short films
American black-and-white films
1927 animated films
Krazy Kat shorts
American road movies
1920s American animated films
1920s rediscovered films
American animated short films
Paramount Pictures short films
Rediscovered American films
Animated films about cats
Animated films about birds